The Turning Point is an album by McCoy Tyner's Big Band released on the Birdology label in 1992. It was recorded in November 1991 and features performances by Tyner's Big Band.

Reception
The Allmusic review by Scott Yanow states that "Tyner's orchestra (seven brass, four reeds and a four-piece rhythm section) is considered one of the major jazz big bands of the 1990s, a perfect outlet for the leader's percussive and modal-oriented piano".

Track listing
All compositions by McCoy Tyner except where noted; all arrangements by composer except where noted.
 "Passion Dance" (arranged by Dennis Mackrel) – 9:05  
 "Let It Go" (Turre)  – 9:14  
 "High Priest" – 5:14  
 "Angel Eyes" (Earl Brent, Matt Dennis; arranged by Slide Hampton) – 5:15  
 "Fly with the Wind" – 11:55  
 "Update" (arranged by Dennis Mackrel) – 8:16  
 "In a Sentimental Mood" (Duke Ellington, Manny Kurtz, Irving Mills; arranged by Tyner) – 6:08

Personnel
 McCoy Tyner – piano, arranger
 Kamau Adilifu – trumpet
 Earl Gardner – trumpet
 Virgil Jones – trumpet
 Frank Lacy – trombone
 Steve Turre – trombone, arranger
 John Clark – French horn
 Howard Johnson – tuba, arranger
 Joe Ford – alto saxophone
 Doug Harris – flute
 Junior Cook – tenor saxophone
 John Stubblefield – tenor saxophone
 Avery Sharpe – double bass, bass guitar
 Aaron Scott – drums
 Jerry González – percussion
 Dennis Mackrel, Slide Hampton – arrangers

References

McCoy Tyner albums
1992 albums
Verve Records albums
Grammy Award for Best Large Jazz Ensemble Album